Areopolis may refer to :

Places and jurisdictions
 Hellenistic and Roman name of present Rabba, in modern Jordan
 the above city's former bishopric and present Latin Catholic titular see
 Areopolis or Areopoli, a town on the Mani Peninsula, Laconia, peninsular Greece

See also 
 Aeropolis 2001, a high-rise building in Japan proposed in 1989